Anuppanadi is a census town in Madurai district  in the state of Tamil Nadu, India.

Demographics
 India census, Chinna Anuppanadi had a population of 15,415. Males constitute 51% of the population and females 49%. Chinna Anuppanadi has an average literacy rate of 70%, higher than the national average of 59.5%; with male literacy of 77% and female literacy of 63%. 11% of the population is under 6 years of age.

Politics
It is part of the Madurai (Lok Sabha constituency). S. Venkatesan also known as  Su. Venkatesan from CPI(M) is the Member of Parliament, Lok Sabha, after his election in the 2019 Indian general election.

References

Cities and towns in Madurai district